Darjeeling Assembly constituency is an assembly constituency in Darjeeling district in the Indian state of West Bengal.

Overview
As per orders of the Delimitation Commission, No. 23 Darjeeling Assembly constituency covers Darjeeling municipality, Darjeeling Pulbazar community development block and Dhootria Kalej Valley, Ghum Khasmahal, Sukhia-Simana, Rangbhang Gopaldhara, Pokhriabong I, Pokhriabong II, Pokhriabong III, Lingia Maraybong, Permaguri Tamsang, Plungdung and Rangbull gram panchayats of Jorebunglow Sukhiapokhri community development block.

Darjeeling Assembly constituency is part of No. 4 Darjeeling (Lok Sabha constituency).

Members of Legislative Assembly

Election results
Source:

2011 Election
In the 2011 West Bengal Legislative Assembly election, Trilok Dewan of GJM defeated his nearest rival Bim Subba of GNLF.

2016 Election

In the 2016 West Bengal Legislative Assembly election, Amar Singh Rai of GJM defeated his nearest rival Sarda Rai Subba of TMC.

2019 By Election
In the West Bengal Legislative Assembly by-election 2019, Neeraj Zimba of BJP defeated his nearest rival Binay Tamang (Independent). The by-election was held because the sitting MLA Amar Singh Rai resigned to contest in the Lok Sabha election.

2021 Election

In the 2021 West Bengal Legislative Assembly election, Neeraj Zimba of BJP defeated his nearest rival Keshav Raj Sharma of GJM (Binay faction).

References

Assembly constituencies of West Bengal
Politics of Darjeeling district